Michał Sczaniecki (1910–1977) was a Polish historian of state and law, especially of Poland and France; professor of Adam Mickiewicz University in Poznań from 1951 to 1965, and director of the Western Institute (Instytut Zachodni) in Poznań from 1961 to 1964, later professor at Warsaw University.

Publications
 Powszechna historia państwa i prawa (Universal history of the state and law)

20th-century Polish historians
Polish male non-fiction writers
Academic staff of Adam Mickiewicz University in Poznań
1910 births
1977 deaths